Axum  may refer to:
Axum, a city in northern Ethiopia also sometimes spelt as Aksum
Kingdom of Aksum, a nation in northeastern Africa in the first millennium AD 
Axum (programming language), a programming language from Microsoft
Axum (Star Wars planet), fictional planet within the Star Wars universe
Axum, an Israeli hip hop/reggae band whose members are of Ethiopian and Moroccan/Yemeni descent
Italian submarine Axum
Axum (album by James Newton)